Francisco José Núñez Rodríguez (born 15 May 1995), better known as Fran Núñez, is a Spanish-born Dominican professional footballer who plays as a winger for Segunda División B club SCR Peña Deportiva, on loan from CF Rayo Majadahonda, and the Dominican Republic national team.

International career
Núñez made his professional debut for the Dominican Republic national football team in a 1-0 friendly over win Guadeloupe on 15 February 2019, and scored his side's only goal.

Personal life
Núñez has a twin brother, Benjamín Núñez, also a footballer, who plays for AD Ceuta FC and is also a member of the Dominican Republic national team.

References

External links
Fran Núñez en Fútbol Dominicano. Net
 
 
 

1995 births
Living people
Citizens of the Dominican Republic through descent
People from Gran Canaria
Sportspeople from the Province of Las Palmas
Spanish twins
Dominican Republic twins
Twin sportspeople
Spanish people of Dominican Republic descent
Sportspeople of Dominican Republic descent
Footballers from the Canary Islands
Spanish footballers
Dominican Republic footballers
Association football wingers
Segunda División B players
Tercera División players
Atlético Levante UD players
UD Somozas players
CF Rayo Majadahonda players
SCR Peña Deportiva players
Dominican Republic international footballers